Audrey Mary Shuey (1900–1977) was an American psychologist and writer. She served as the Chair of the Department of Psychology at Randolph-Macon Women's College.

Early life
Audrey M. Shuey was born in 1900. Shuey took her B.A. at the University of Illinois, her M.A. at Wellesley College, and her Ph.D. at Columbia University where she was a student of Henry Garrett.

Career
Shuey served as the Chair of the Department of Psychology at Randolph-Macon Woman's College.

Shuey published the book The Testing of Negro Intelligence (1958, 2nd ed., 1966) surveying and summarizing the results of 40 years of intelligence tests involving whites and blacks. It argued that the 15-point Black-White average IQ difference remained constant from the 1910s to the 1960s, across all regions of the U.S., as well as in Canada and Jamaica. The publication and distribution of her book was funded by Wickliffe Draper and the Pioneer Fund, in a bid to counter the desegregation of the American school system following Brown vs. Board of Education.

Reception
The scholar Graham Richards noted that Shuey's text relied on unpublished material like masters and doctoral theses, many of which originated in the Deep South, that some pre-1940s material that she used contained methodological flaws, and that she overstated the consistency of her sources.

The psychologist Hans Eysenck praised Shuey's work.

Death
Shuey died in 1977.

References

Publications
Shuey, Audrey M. (1966). The Testing of Negro Intelligence (2nd ed.). New York: Social Science Press.

1910 births
1977 deaths
American psychology writers
American women psychologists
20th-century American psychologists
20th-century American women writers
Columbia University alumni
Intelligence researchers
Race and intelligence controversy
Randolph College faculty
University of Illinois alumni
Wellesley College alumni
American women academics